Liang Chen (born 25 February 1989) is a former professional Chinese tennis player.

Liang has a career-high singles ranking of 342, achieved on 21 September 2009. Her career-high WTA doubles ranking of 35, she reached on 26 October 2015.

Liang made her WTA Tour main-draw doubles debut, partnering Zhou Yimiao at the 2009 Guangzhou International Women's Open. They lost in the first round to Peng Shuai and Xu Yifan.

At the 2011 Guangzhou International Women's Open, partnering Tian Ran, they defeated Alona Bondarenko and Mariya Koryttseva 4–6, 6–3, [12–10] in the first round before losing to the second seeds Alberta Brianti and Petra Martić in the quarterfinals.

Playing for China Fed Cup team, she has a win-loss record of 3–2.

WTA career finals

Doubles: 11 (6 titles, 5 runner-ups)

WTA 125 tournament finals

Doubles: 1 (title)

ITF Circuit finals

Singles: 11 (4 titles, 7 runner–ups)

Doubles: 25 (13 titles, 12 runner–ups)

References

External links
 
 
 

1989 births
Living people
Chinese female tennis players
Sportspeople from Xuzhou
Tennis players from Jiangsu
21st-century Chinese women